Bury Me in Kern County is a 1998 American black comedy film directed by Julien Nitzberg, starring Mary Sheridan, Mary Lynn Rajskub and Judson Mills.

Cast
 Mary Sheridan as Sandra
 Mary Lynn Rajskub as Dean
 Judson Mills as Amanda
 Johnny Strong as Oldie
 Thom Rachford as Sgt. Pollock
 Sandra Tucker as Dani
 Victor Raider-Wexler as Mr. Decapato
 Geraldine Allen as Grandma

Release
The film premiered at South by Southwest in March 1998.

Reception
Godfrey Cheshire of Variety called the film an "impressively assured and surprisingly pro debut" from Nitzberg, writing that he "combines a well-developed sardonic sense and some truly inspired casting choices to fashion a redneck mayhem fiesta that could find a welcoming fan base if accurately targeted toward hipper college and young urban auds."

Merle Bertrand of Film Threat wrote that the film features a "beyond redemption family that only Jerry Springer could love" and called the performances "over-the-top".

References

External links
 
 

American black comedy films
1990s black comedy films